Björgólfur Hideaki Takefusa (born 11 May 1980) is an Icelandic former football forward.

Early life
Takefusa's mother is daughter of Margrét Þóra Hallgrímsson and American Nazi Party founder George Lincoln Rockwell, and adoptive daughter of Björgólfur Guðmundsson. His father is Kenichi Takefusa, noted in Iceland for teaching karate and founding the company 
JapÍs, which imported Japanese musical instruments and later became a record label.
When Björgólfur was four years old, Kenichi left his family and returned to Japan. Björgólfur's parents divorced when he was five.

Career 
His football career started at Þróttur, where he made 37 league appearances. From Þróttur he was signed by Fylkir and played two seasons there. He was signed to KR from Fylkir in October 2005 after having enjoyed a spell there from 2003. Takefusa moved from KR to Viking in October 2010. The most significant goal he ever scored was in a KR victory against AE Larissa in the UEFA Europa League 2009-2010 second qualifying round. This goal sealed a 2–0 victory and a tie against FC Basel in the next qualifying round. He was goal king in 2009.

Takefusa played three times for the Icelandic national team, against Mexico 2003, Georgia and Iran in 2009.

Personal life
Takefusa's half-sister is the former TV presenter Dóra Takefusa.

References

External links

1980 births
Living people
Bjorgolfur Hideaki Takefusa
Bjorgolfur Hideaki Takefusa
Bjorgolfur Hideaki Takefusa
Bjorgolfur Hideaki Takefusa
Bjorgolfur Hideaki Takefusa
Icelandic people of Japanese descent
Icelandic people of Danish descent
Icelandic people of American descent
Icelandic people of British descent
Icelandic people of German descent
Icelandic people of French descent
Association football forwards
Bjorgolfur Hideaki Takefusa
Bjorgolfur Hideaki Takefusa
Bjorgolfur Hideaki Takefusa